Tofana may refer to:
 Tofana di Mezzo (3,244 m), Tofana di Dentro (3,238), and Tofana di Rozes (3,225 m), three of the highest peaks of the Tofane mountain group in Italy
 Giulia Tofana, an Italian high class courtier and professional poisoner at the court of Philip IV of Spain
 Aqua Tofana, a poison